Murravia is a genus of brachiopods belonging to the family Cancellothyrididae.

The species of this genus are found on the coasts of Australia.

Species:

Murravia catinuliformis 
Murravia exarata 
Murravia fosteri

References

Brachiopod genera